A burl or burr is a deformed outgrowth on a tree trunk.

Burl may also refer to:
 Burl (given name)
 Burl (EP), 1986 EP by American band Killdozer
 Aubrey Burl (1926–2020), British archaeologist
 Ryan Burl (born 1994), Zimbabwean cricketer
 Burl., botanic author abbreviation for mycologist Gertrude Simmons Burlingham (1872–1952)
 Dakota Burl, a type of composite wood material

See also
 Berl (name)
 Burr (disambiguation)
 Burling, a surname